is a city located in Saitama Prefecture, Japan. , the city had an estimated population of 61,540 in 27,461 households and a population density of 2300 persons per km².

Geography
Located in east-central Saitama Prefecture, Hasuda is directly north of the prefectural capital of Saitama City. It consists of the Hasuda Plateau in the center of the city, which is part of the Omiya Plateau , the Shiraoka (Kurohama) Plateau in the east, with Motoara River in between, and the lowlands around the Ayase River that runs west and south.

Surrounding municipalities
Saitama Prefecture
 Saitama
 Okegawa
 Ageo
 Kuki
 Shiraoka
 Ina

Climate
Hasuda has a Humid subtropical climate (Köppen Cfa) characterized by warm summers and cool winters with light to no snowfall.  The average annual temperature in Hasuda is 14.7 °C. The average annual rainfall is 1363 mm with September as the wettest month. The temperatures are highest on average in August, at around 26.7 °C, and lowest in January, at around 3.8 °C.

Demographics
Per Japanese census data, the population of Hasuda peaked around the year 2000 and has declined slightly in the decades since.

History
The area of modern Hasuda has been settled since the prehistoric period, and there are numerous archaeological sites, including shell middens and burial mounds within the city limits. In addition, traces of samurai residences and castles from the Sengoku period remain. Much of what is now Hasuda was part of Iwatsuki Domain under the Edo period Tokugawa shogunate. After the Meiji restoration, the village of Ayase was created within Minamisaitama District with the establishment of the modern municipalities system on April 1, 1889. It was raised to town status on October 1, 1934 and renamed Hasuda.  Hasuda annexed the neighboring villages of Kurohama and Hirano on May 3, 1954 and was elevated to city status on October 1, 1972.

On March 31, 2010, Hasuda was to be merged with the neighboring town of Shiraoka (from Minamisaitama District). However, the merger was canceled shortly after Shiraoka managed to grow its population to 50,000 people, qualifying it as a city.

Government
Hasuda has a mayor-council form of government with a directly elected mayor and a unicameral city council of 20 members. Hasuda contributes one member to the Saitama Prefectural Assembly. In terms of national politics, the city is part of Saitama 13th district of the lower house of the Diet of Japan.

Economy
Due to this location, Hasuda is primarily a bedroom community with over half of its population commuting to neighboring Saitama City or to the Tokyo metropolis for work. However, much of the city remains agricultural.

Education 
Hasuda has eight public elementary schools and five public middle schools operated by the city government, and one public high school operated by the Saitama Prefectural Board of Education. The prefecture also operates two special education schools for the handicapped.

Kindergarten
 Oyama kindergarten
 Kurohama kindergarten
 Shirayuri kindergarten
 Shinjuku kindergarten
 Hasuda Kindergarten
 Nursery
 Nakamura home nursery room
 Hasuda Municipal Kaizuka nursery
 Hasuda Municipal Kurohama Nursery
 Hasuda Municipal Chuo nursery
 Hasuda Municipal Hasuda South nursery
 Hasuda Municipal East nursery
 Hasuda Municipal Uruido nursery
 Elementary school
 Hasuda Municipal Kurohama Kita Elementary school
 Hasuda Municipal Kurohama Elementary School
 Hasuda Municipal Kurohama Nishi Elementary School
 Hasuda Municipal Kurohama Minami Elementary School
 Hasuda Municipal Hasuda North Elementary School
 Hasuda Municipal Hasuda Central Primary School
 Hasuda Municipal Hasuda Minami Elementary School
 Hasuda Municipal Plain Elementary School
 Middle Schools
 Hasuda Municipal Kurohama Middle School
 Hasuda Municipal Kurohama Nishi Middle School
 Hasuda Municipal Hasuda Middle School
 Hasuda Municipal Hasuda south Middle School
 Hasuda Municipal Hirano Middle School
 High Schools
 Saitama Hasuda Shoin High School
 Vocational school
 National Hospital Organization Higashisaitamabyoin University School of Nursing
 Special Education School
 Saitama Prefectural Hasuda Special Education School

Transportation

Railway
 JR East – Utsunomiya Line

Highway
  – Hasuda Service Area and Smart Interchange

Local attractions
Kurohama Shell Midden, a Jōmon period National Historic Monument

References

External links

Official Website 

Cities in Saitama Prefecture
Hasuda, Saitama